Bastien Pinault (born October 18, 1993) is a French professional basketball player for Nanterre 92 of LNB Pro A.

Professional career
Born in Tarbes, he was trained at the Élan Béarnais Pau-Lacq-Orthez and then played for La Rochelle. Pinault played the 2016-17 season with ALM Évreux. He averaged 8.8 points, 1.6 rebounds and 2 assists per game in Pro B. In June 2017 he inked with Élan Chalon to a two-year deal.

On July 5, 2021, he has signed with Nanterre 92 of LNB Pro A.

References 

1993 births
Living people
ALM Évreux Basket players
Élan Béarnais players
Élan Chalon players
French men's basketball players
Metropolitans 92 players
Nanterre 92 players
Shooting guards
Sportspeople from Tarbes